Compston is a surname. Notable people with the surname include:

 Alastair Compston (born 1948), British neurologist
 Archie Compston (1893–1962), English golfer
 Joshua Compston (1970–1996), British gallerist
 Martin Compston (born 1984), Scottish actor
 Peter Compston (1915–2000), Royal Navy officer
 Robert J. O. Compston (1898–1962), English fighter pilot
 William Compston (born 1931), Australian geophysicist